OFC Akademik Svishtov is a Bulgarian association football club based in Svishtov who play in the North-West Third League, the third tier of Bulgarian football.

It plays its home matches at Akademik stadium with a capacity of 13,500 seats, and its team colours are blue and white. Akademik have spent four seasons in the Bulgarian first division in the past, the last time being the 1986–87 season.

History 
Akademik was founded on 10 November 1949, on general assembly of the D.A. Tsenov Academy of Economics in Svishtov. Akademik's first president was professor Velislav Gavriyski.

In 1975–76 season, the club won B PFG title and with it gained promotion to the A PFG for the first time in its history. In the following campaign, Akademik finished their debut A PFG season in 13th place. In 1977–78 season, Akademik had their best Bulgarian Cup run, beating Yantra Gabrovo, Dimitrovgrad, Benkovski Isperih and Slavia Sofia before losing to Marek Dupnitsa in the semi-finals. In the league, the club won just nine games and were relegated.

Seven years later, they won a second promotion to the top division by winning the B PFG. In 1985–86 season, Akademik achieved their highest A PFG placing of 11th. However, the next year they were relegated again.

In 2005, Akademik dropped to third division, for the third time in their history. In the following 8 years, they spent their longest ever period out of the professional football. In 2012–13 season, Akademik were promoted to the B PFG as winners of the North-West V AFG.

League positions

Honours
A PFG
11th place: 1985–86
B PFG
Champions (2): 1975-76, 1984–85
Bulgarian Cup
Semi-finalists: 1977-78

Seasons in A Group

References

External links 
 Unofficial website

Association football clubs established in 1949
Football clubs in Bulgaria
1949 establishments in Bulgaria